Tabish Khair is an Indian English author and associate professor in the Department of English, University of Aarhus, Denmark.  His books include Babu Fictions (2001), The Bus Stopped (2004), which was shortlisted for the Encore Award (UK) and The Thing About Thugs (2010), which has been shortlisted for a number of prizes, including the DSC Prize for South Asian Literature and the Man Asian Literary Prize. His poem Birds of North Europe won first prize in the sixth Poetry Society All India Poetry Competition held in 1995. In 2022, he published a new Sci Fi novel, [The Body by the Shore].

Biography

Born and educated mostly in Gaya, India, Khair has received honours and awards including first prize in the sixth Poetry Society (India) Competition held in 1995, an honorary fellowship for creative writing from the Baptist University of Hong Kong, fellowships at New Delhi's universities and a by-fellowship at Churchill College, Cambridge University, UK. He is currently based in Denmark.

Other Routes (2005), an anthology of travel writing by Africans and Asians, was edited by Khair (with a foreword by Amitav Ghosh). Khair's Encore shortlisted novel, The Bus Stopped, has already appeared in French, Italian and Portuguese. His novel Filming (2007) is set against the backdrop of the Partition of India and the 1940s Bombay film industry. It has been greeted with acclaim: "...in keeping with Khair's pertinent and thought-provoking musings on self-deception". An excerpt of the novel has been anthologised in Ahmede Hussain's The New Anthem: The Subcontinent in its Own Words. In June 2008, it was shortlisted for the Vodafone Crossword Book Award in India. Anthology of Contemporary Indian Poetry (United States).

Khair's study The Gothic, Postcolonialism and Otherness was released by Palgrave (Macmillan) in the UK and US in the winter of 2009. His novel The Thing About Thugs was published by HarperCollins in summer 2010 and shortlisted for The Hindu Best Fiction Award, the DSC Prize for South Asian Literature 2012, and Man Asian Literary Prize. Khair's works have been translated into various languages; the Danish translation of Filming: A Love Story was shortlisted for Denmark's top translation/literature award (the ALOA prize).

His novel How to Fight Islamist Terror from the Missionary Position was released in India in 2012.

Bibliography

 (Co-authored with Sebastien Doubinsky)

 Appearances in the following poetry anthologies:
 Travelogue : The Grand Indian Express (2018), ed. by Dr. Ananad Kumar and published by Authorspress, New Delhi
 A New Book of Indian Poems in English (2000), ed. by Gopi Kottoor and published by Poetry Chain and Writers Workshop, Calcutta

Interview :

 "The Brooklyn Rail : In conversation with Tabish Khair"
 "Cha: An Asian Literary Journal"
 "Interview with Tabish Khair"
 "Tabish Khair with Ankit Khandelwal at The Times of India"
 "Interview : IANS"

References

External links
 Review of The Body by the Shore 
 Official author website
 Poetry International Web page on Khair
 Tabish Khair page at HarperCollins India
 Nilanshu Kumar Agarwal, "From Coolie Hinterland to Babu Stardom: An Interview with Tabish Khair". Epiphany: Online Journal of the Faculty of Arts and Social Sciences, International University of Sarajevo, ISSN 1840-3719 / Volume 1 / No. 1, Fall 2008.

 How to Fight Islamist Terror from the Missionary Position by Tabish Khair – review at Guardian

Living people
Date of birth missing (living people)
Indian male novelists
Indian male journalists
English-language poets from India
Postcolonialism
Indian male poets
People from Gaya, India
Poets from Bihar
Novelists from Bihar
Year of birth missing (living people)
All India Poetry Prize